The Colebrook Center Historic District encompasses the town center of Colebrook, Connecticut.  Located in an isolated valley at the junction of Connecticut Route 183 with Rockwell and Smith Hill Roads, the village was established in 1767, and has seen little change since about 1860.  It was listed on the National Register of Historic Places in 1991.

Description and history
The town of Colebrook is located in the hills of northwestern Connecticut, just south of the Massachusetts state line.  It was surveyed in the mid-18th century and settled 1765 by natives of Windsor and East Windsor.  It was incorporate in 1779.  The oldest surviving house in Colebrook village, an ell to the Samuel Rockwell House, dates to this time.  The location of the town center was a contentious matter, with a site probably near the present village church chosen c. 1790.  With little land suitable for agriculture, the town's economy in the 19th century was dominated by the raising of sheep and cattle, and the operation of associated businesses such as tanneries, some of which were located just north of the main intersection on Center Brook.  Since 1860, the village center has seen little change, and its economy is dominated by summer tourism.

The historic district is centered on the triangular common formed by Route 183, Smith Hill Road, and Thompson Road, with the Greek Revival church (built 1842) at the southern end.  Extending north from the common are a cluster of residential and civic buildings, including the recently built town hall, one of the district's few late 20th-century intrusions.  Opposite the town hall is the 1812 Colebrook Store, one of the district's finest examples of Federal period architecture.  North of the store is the Samuel Rockwell House, and beyond that the district descends to Center Brook.  Most of the principal buildings of the district were built before 1880, with mainly secondary buildings (garages, barns, and other outbuildings) built afterward.

See also

National Register of Historic Places listings in Litchfield County, Connecticut

References

Historic districts on the National Register of Historic Places in Connecticut
National Register of Historic Places in Litchfield County, Connecticut
Colonial architecture in the United States
Federal architecture in Connecticut
Greek Revival architecture in Connecticut
Colebrook, Connecticut